Kakhaber Kuchava (born 23 September 1979) is a Georgian politician. Member of Parliament of Georgia since 2016. Speaker of Parliament of Georgia from 27 April 2021 to 24 December 2021.

Biography
 Mining and Geology Company “Georgian Copper and Gold”, Director General (2015 - 2016)
 JSC “Caucasus Minerals”, Director General (2012 - 2016)
 International Business Organization “International Chamber of Commerce”, Member of the Board of Directors (2011 - 2015)
 International Financial Corporation (IFC), expert of the corporate law (2007 - 2010)
 USAID project “Business Environment Reform”, specialist of the corporate and business law (2005 - 2007)
 Maritime Transport Agency of Georgia, Head of Legal Department (2005)
 Red Cross Society Georgia, Legal Advisor (2005)
 Law Firm “Mgaloblishvili, Kipiani, Dzidziguri”, Senior Lawyer (2001 - 2004)
 Red Cross Society Georgia, Legal Advisor (2001 - 2002)

References

External links
 Parliament of Georgia

1979 births
Living people
Speakers of the Parliament of Georgia
Georgian Dream politicians
Members of the Parliament of Georgia
21st-century politicians from Georgia (country)